Thawi Watthana is one of the seven subdistricts (tambon) of Sai Noi District, in Nonthaburi Province, Thailand. The subdistrict is bounded by (clockwise from north) Khun Si, Sai Noi, Phimon Rat, Bang Khu Rat, Nong Phrao Ngai and Naraphirom subdistricts. In 2020 it had a total population of 8,862 people.

Administration

Central administration
The subdistrict is subdivided into 8 administrative villages (muban).

Local administration
The whole area of the subdistrict is covered by Thawi Watthana Subdistrict Administrative Organization.

References

External links
Website of Thawi Watthana Subdistrict Administrative Organization

Tambon of Nonthaburi province
Populated places in Nonthaburi province